Valeri Valerievich Skorodumov (born 20 May 1992) is a Russian football official and a former player. He is an team supervisor with FC Torpedo Moscow.

Club career
He made his debut in the Russian Professional Football League for FC Biolog-Novokubansk on 10 April 2014 in a game against FC Gazprom transgaz Stavropol Ryzdvyany.

References

External links
 

1992 births
Footballers from Moscow
Living people
Russian footballers
FC Torpedo Moscow players
Association football midfielders